Story of Judas is a 2015 French drama film directed by Rabah Ameur-Zaïmeche. It was screened in the Contemporary World Cinema section of the 2015 Toronto International Film Festival.

Cast
 Nabil Djedouani as Jesus
 Mohamed Aroussi as Carabas
 Rabah Ameur-Zaïmeche as Judas Iscariot
 Marie Loustalot as Bathsheba
 Patricia Malvoisin as Susanna
 Nouari Nezzar as Caiaphas
 Eliott Khayat as the scribe
 Régis Laroche as Pontius Pilate
 Xavier Mussel as Menenius

References

External links
 

2015 films
2015 drama films
French drama films
2010s French-language films
Portrayals of Jesus in film
Cultural depictions of Judas Iscariot
Cultural depictions of Pontius Pilate
2010s French films